Koki Ogawa may refer to:
, Japanese actor
, Japanese footballer